Roie Galitz (born November 20, 1980) is an Israeli photographer, entrepreneur and environmental activist. He is known for his wildlife photographs, some of which have won international awards, especially those taken north of the Arctic Circle. Locally, Galitz founded Israel's largest school of photography, a photography-oriented travel company and the Israel Photography Conference.

Galitz is a Greenpeace Ambassador and engages in conservation work around the world. He is recognized for his talks at the United Nations, the NYC Climate Week and TEDx talks in Helsinki University, Glasgow and Wexford alongside global conventions everywhere. Galitz is also an ambassador for Nikon, Gitzo, G-Technology, and Lowepro. 

Galitz grew up in Netanya, and currently lives in New York City. He has four children.

Photography
Galitz started out as a photographer taking pictures of static objects such as jewelry. He then worked as a pension insurance salesman, before returning to photography. His main interests are travel and wildlife conservation. In 2015, one of his wildlife photos, dubbed Run for Your Life, received an honorable mention at the Siena International Photo Awards. In May 2015, on his third trip to Svalbard, Galitz was able to capture close-ups of polar bears. One such image, where a polar bear catches a seal, received an honorable mention at the Siena Awards, 2016. In 2017 he received first place at Siena in the Fragile Ice category for a photo of a sleeping polar bear titled Dreaming on Sea Ice. Another honorable mention, as well as a remarkable artwork award, came in 2019 at Siena for additional polar bear pictures. Additional awards received by Galitz's polar bear pictures include third place in the nature and wildlife category at the 2016 International Photography Awards.

In 2017, Israeli daily Israel Hayom called Galitz one of the leading nature photographers in Israel and the world.

Entrepreneurship
After taking a job teaching photography in 2007, Galitz opened his own school, which went on to become the biggest school of this kind in Israel. Until 2017, it had served about 23,000 students in 1,300 classes. Aside from the original Ramat Gan facility, the school opened additional branches in Jerusalem and Haifa. In 2010, he founded PhotoTeva, a travel company specializing in photo travel. He also founded TalkMaster, a public speaking school. In 2018, Galitz was listed as one of 40 under-40 managers in Israel.

Activism
Galitz has been campaigning to raise awareness to environmental issues, some of which he encountered in his travels and photo shoots. He has signed on as Antarctic Ambassador for Greenpeace. He gave multiple TEDx talks on the subject.

Exhibitions

Solo exhibitions

 September–October 2015: single-artist exhibit at the Jaffa Museum
2016: A Disappearing World, Tel-Hai Museum of Photography, Israel 

Group exhibitions

 2015: Beyond the Lens, Sienna Photography Exhibition, Siena, Italy
 2016: Nature's Best Photography, Windland Smith Rice International Awards Exhibition,' Smithsonian National Museum of Natural History, Washington DC, USA
 2016: Beyond the Lens, Sienna Photography Exhibition, Sienna, Italy
 2016: Global Arctic Awards Photo Exhibition, Gogol Centre, Moscow, Russia
 2017: Beyond the Lens, Sienna Photography Exhibition, Sienna, Italy
 2018: Beyond the Lens, Sienna Photography Exhibition, Sienna, Italy
 2018: Travel Photographer of the Year Exhibition, London
 2019: Glanzlichter Exhibition of Nature Photography; State Museum of Natural History, Karlsruhe, Germany
 2019: Wild and Crazy, The Finnish Nature Center Haltia, Helsinki, Finland
 2019: Memorial Maria Lucia, International Mountain, Nature and Adventure,'' Traveling Exhibition, Europe

Awards 

 2016: Olympic Photo Circuit, Nature & Open Color - PSA Gold
 2016: International Photographer of the Year - Second Prize
 2016: PX3 Prix de la Photographie Paris, Professional Nature Wildlife - Third Prize
 2016: International Photography Awards, Professional Wildlife - Third Prize
 2017: Siena International Photography Awards, Fragile Ice - First Prize 
 2017: Glanzlichter, Sleeping Animals - First Prize
 2017: Global Arctic Awards, Antarctica - GPU Gold Medal
 2017: Global Arctic Awards, Polar Bears - PSA Gold Medal
 2017: Nature Photographer of the Year, Comedy - Second Prize
 2017: International Photography Awards, Landscapes - Third Prize
 2017: One EyeLand Awards - 3 Bronze Medals
 2018: GTC Awards for Excellence, BBC ONE's Snow Bears' Camera Team
 2018: One Eyeland, Nature and Editorial - 2 Bronze Medals
 2018: Outdoor Photographer of the Year, View from Above - Second Prize
 2018: Salon PhotoArt Celebration, Travel - CFFU Silver Medal
 2018: Wildlife Photo Awards, Animal Behavior - Second Prize
 2018: Nordic Nature Photo Contest, Travel Photography - First Prize
 2018: Kyrgyzstan Photo Salon, Nature & Travel - 2 Gold Medals
 2018: Israel Photo Salon, Blue & White - FIAP Gold medal
 2018: One Eyeland, Nature, Aerial - Gold Medal
 2018: Natural World International Photo Contest, Gran Prix d'Estate - Best Author
 2019: ND Awards, Professional Nature Wildlife - 3rd Prize
 2019: DNSY Salon, Black & White - Silver Medal
 2019: NY Soho Salon, Nature - Silver Medal
 2019: WildlifePhoto, Animal Behavior - Second Prize 
 2019: 4th Balkan International Exhibition, Water - FIAP Gold Medal
 2019: 4th Balkan International Exhibition - FIAP Blue Badge for Best Author
 2019: 7th Greek Photographic Circuit, Nature - PSA Gold Medal
 2019: 12th NBPC International Salon of Photography, Nature - FIAP Gold Medal
 2019: ROAM Awards, Lessons - 1st Place
 2019: Picture of the Year, Reportage, Science & Natural History - 2 Awards of Excellence

References

External links
 
 

Israeli photographers
1980 births
Living people
Nature photographers
Israeli environmentalists
People from Netanya
People associated with Greenpeace